Mokhtavai (also Romanized as Mokhtavā’ī; also known as Mokhtābādī, Mokhtavāy, and Mokhtavāy-ye ‘Olyā) is a village in Beyranvand-e Jonubi Rural District, Bayravand District, Khorramabad County, Lorestan Province, Iran. At the 2006 census, its population was 161, in 34 families.

References 

Towns and villages in Khorramabad County